The 2016–17 Österreichische Basketball Bundesliga season, for sponsorships reasons named the Admiral Basketball Bundesliga, was the 71st season of the first tier of basketball in Austria.

Teams

Regular season

Standings

Play-offs

Austrian clubs in international competitions

References

External links
Official website 

Österreichische Basketball Bundesliga seasons
Austrian
Lea